Michael David Spound (born April 8, 1957) is an American actor and writer.

Early life 

Born in Santa Monica, California in 1957. Parents, Joan and Albert, moved the family (siblings Amy and Jack) to Massachusetts in 1959 settling in Concord. His first acting experiences were with the Concord Players where Spound was in the ensemble of The King and I (1964) and played the role of Billy in King of Hearts (1965). He attended The Fenn School in Concord (1966–1971), Phillips Academy Andover (1971–1975) and graduated Northwestern University after studying Theatre and Film in 1979.

Career 

Within six months of arriving in Los Angeles, Spound landed the lead in the Paramount/ABC TV pilot Homeroom opposite Ally Sheedy (1981). In the fall of 1981 he and Dana Olsen wrote the feature film Wacko starring Joe Don Baker, Stella Stevens and Andrew Dice Clay. He guest starred in television series Happy Days, Laverne & Shirley, Family Ties, and Teachers Only in the early '80s. In 1983, he was cast as Dave Kendall in the ABC series Hotel pilot that starred James Brolin, Connie Sellecca and Bette Davis. The pilot was shot at the Fairmont San Francisco Hotel and the series won the favorite drama award at the 10th People's Choice Awards in 1984. Hotel ran for five years (Anne Baxter replaced Bette Davis in the series) and Spound married his co-star and TV wife, Heidi Bohay (Megan Kendall) in 1988.

Spound and Bohay continued to work in television (Hollywood Squares (game show), Pyramid) most notably co-hosting the Emmy-winning syndicated Better Homes and Gardens (TV series).

Spound has guest starred on over forty different television series including Stitchers, The Last Ship, Hart of Dixie, Criminal Minds, Law & Order: LA, The New Adventures of Old Christine, The West Wing, ER, JAG, NYPD Blue, Matlock, Murder, She Wrote, and has had recurring characters on Star Trek: Voyager, Providence, and Days of Our Lives.

Film credits include Must Love Dogs starring Diane Lane, DreamWorks' The Ring starring Naomi Watts, and the Gary David Goldberg comedy, Bye Bye Love.

On Broadway, Spound originated the role of Rob Stein in Jon Tolins' The Twilight of the Golds at the Booth Theatre in 1993– also doing the National Tour from the Pasadena Playhouse to The Kennedy Center. Off-Broadway and Los Angeles theatre credits include Beau Jest (Laura Patinkin) at The Lamb's Theatre in NYC, the George Furth comedy Sex, Sex, Sex, Sex and Sex at The Matrix Theatre, the LA premiere of the Obie winning A Shayna Maidel at The Tiffany Theatre, and King of Hearts opposite Courteney Cox at The Tiffany Theatre. Spound also originated the role of Jack Waters in Troubled Waters opposite Cynthia Gibb at The Court Theatre in Los Angeles.

Personal life 
Spound has been married to his former Hotel co-star Heidi Bohay since 1988 and lives in Los Angeles with their three children. Spound is the co-founder and a teacher at Center Stage Workshop for young actors at the Whitefire Theatre in Sherman Oaks, CA.

Filmography: Film and Television

References

External links 
 
 Michael Spound at the Internet Broadway Database
 Michael Spound at TV Guide
 Michael Spound at Hollywood.com

1957 births
Living people
People from Santa Monica, California
Male actors from Massachusetts
American male television actors
Television personalities from California